7 Colors (a.k.a. Filler) is a puzzle game, designed by Dmitry Pashkov. It was developed by the Russian company  in 1991. The game was published by Infogrames for MS-DOS, Amiga, and NEC PC-9801.

Reception

References

External links

Video games developed in Russia
1991 video games
Infogrames games
Puzzle video games
DOS games
Amiga games
NEC PC-9801 games